Volta Aluminum Company, known as VALCO, is an aluminium company based in Tema, Greater Accra Region founded by Kaiser Aluminum and now wholly owned by the government of Ghana.

History
VALCO was a joint venture with Kaiser Aluminum and ALCOA, major aluminum conglomerates both based in the United States, in the British Gold Coast colony in 1948.

In 1961, Kaiser Aluminum & the Ghana Government invested in the Akosombo Hydroelectric Project to provide energy for its aluminum smelters. The company had negotiated favorable terms for power purchase with the government. The agreement was re-negotiated in 1985,  by the Rawlings government, to reflect the increased value of electrical energy.

In May 2003 VALCO closed completely due to problems in negotiating a supply of electricity. On August 4, 2004, Alcoa and the Government of the Republic of Ghana announced that they had finalized agreements to restart the VALCO smelter in Tema, Ghana.  The plan, which included the restart 3 potlines at VALCO, representing 120,000 metric tons per year (mtpy), was to be implemented in the first quarter of 2006.].

It reopened in early 2006.

In June 2008, ALCOA sold its 10% stake in VALCO to the government of Ghana.

Operations
VALCO smelts alumina to produce aluminium ingots at its smelter at Tema.  Locally, a major Ghanaian customer of VALCO is Aluworks. While one motivation for establishing the plant was the local availability of bauxite, the major raw material of alumina, VALCO imported alumina to produce aluminum.

The smelter has a capacity of 200,000 metric tons per year of ingots but was shut down between 2007 and 2011. In early 2011, it began reoperating  at about 20% of its capacity, producing 3,000 tons per month, mostly for local consumption, with plans to activate a second potline to bring monthly production up to 6,000 tons in Tema.

See also
Aluminium in Africa

References

External links
Volta Aluminum at Alcoa website

Aluminium companies of Ghana
Aluminium smelters
Alcoa
Kaiser Aluminum
Joint ventures
Manufacturing companies established in 1948
1948 establishments in Gold Coast (British colony)